Out Front, OutFront, Outfront, or similar terms may refer to:

 Out Front (Booker Little album), a 1961 Booker Little jazz album
 Out Front! (Jaki Byard album), a 1964 Jaki Byard jazz album
 Out Front (newspaper), a Denver LGBT newspaper
 OutFront Minnesota, an LGBT rights organization
 Erin Burnett OutFront (a.k.a. "OutFront"), a CNN TV news magazine
 Outfront Media, formerly CBS Outdoor, an outdoor billboard advertising company
 Outfront, the original title of the Soldiers: Heroes of World War II videogame

See also
 Infront
 Out (disambiguation)
 Front (disambiguation)